Kew Bridge railway station is a railway station in Brentford, the London Borough of Hounslow, and is in Travelcard Zone 3. The station and all trains serving it are operated by South Western Railway. The station was named after the nearby Kew Bridge.

History

The station was built by the Windsor, Staines and South Western Railway (WS&SWR) and was opened on 22 August 1849 by the London and South Western Railway (LSWR), which had absorbed the WS&SWR whilst that railway was under construction. Originally named Kew, it was renamed Kew Bridge on 1 January 1869. The North & South Western Junction Railway in a spirit of affording LSWR access to Fenchurch Street operated its admittedly rival 'Kew' station (1853–1866) on the western curve. From 1862 the companies cooperated: the junction railway company built additional Kew Bridge platforms (which were closed in 1940), the LSWR having constructed the eastern curve itself.

The Grade II listed large station building, designed by Sir William Tite, is now a coffee shop.

Present
The station, on the Hounslow Loop Line, is on the southern and eastern curves of the Kew Bridge railway triangle, although the eastern curve platforms are abandoned. The station building was extensively refurbished in June 2013, with the platforms reached by a side walkway.

The station has 2 active platforms and 2 disused platforms:
 Platform 2: Trains to Brentford, Hounslow and Weybridge
 Platform 1: Trains to Chiswick, Barnes, Clapham Junction and London Waterloo
 Platform 3: Currently disused, served trains via South Acton
 Platform 4: Currently disused, served trains from South Acton continuing via Chiswick.

There are currently no passenger services on the eastern and western curves, but both have been proposed by the London Borough of Hounslow for Crossrail and also for Zone 3 Overground Orbirail. The football stadium redevelopment plan includes space for additional platforms on the other curves.

Briefly, between 2000 and 2002, Anglia Railways ran trains originating from the Great Eastern Main Line via the North London Line and the western curve as far as Basingstoke. This was termed the "Crosslink" service.

Local attractions
Britain's largest foldable cycle manufacturer, Brompton Bicycle, is based behind the station, along the northeast edge of the railway triangle. Nearby attractions include the Royal Botanic Gardens, Kew, the London Museum of Water & Steam, Gtech Community Stadium and the Musical Museum, Brentford.

Proposals 
Hounslow Council proposed that Crossrail services from the east have the option of terminating at Hounslow as well as Reading by a mix of existing line and new connections. This proposal was rejected.

Other plans have been drafted and floated to Network Rail for reinstatement of track on the curves and direct services for Brentford Football Club's development of its Lionel Road stadium.

Gallery

Service 

The typical off-peak weekday service in trains per hour is
 6 to London Waterloo of which
 4 run direct via Putney and
 2 run circuitously via Brentford
 2 to Weybridge.
On Sundays there is one train per hour in each direction between Waterloo and  via  and one train per hour in each direction between Waterloo and Twickenham, Kingston, Wimbledon and Waterloo via Hounslow.

Connections
London Buses routes 65, 110, 237, 267, night routes N9 and N65 serve the station.

See also 
 Kew Bridge
 Kew
 Royal Botanic Gardens, Kew
 Kew Gardens station (London)

References

External links 

Railway stations in the London Borough of Hounslow
Former London and South Western Railway stations
Railway stations in Great Britain opened in 1849
Railway stations in Great Britain opened in 1862
Railway stations in Great Britain closed in 1940
Railway stations served by South Western Railway
Brentford, London
Grade II listed buildings in the London Borough of Hounslow
Grade II listed railway stations
Royal Botanic Gardens, Kew
William Tite railway stations
Gunnersbury
1849 establishments in England
1940 disestablishments in England